Roger Joseph Foys is an American prelate of the Roman Catholic Church who served as bishop of the Diocese of Covington in Kentucky from 2002 to 2021.

Biography

Early life 
On July 27, 1945, Roger Foys was born in Chicago, Illinois.  He began his religious studies at St. John Vianney Seminary in Bloomingdale, Ohio.  Foys completed his graduate studies at The Catholic University of America in Washington, D.C. and the Pontifical Gregorian University in Rome.

Priesthood 
On May 16, 1973, Bishop Anthony Mussio ordained Foys as a priest for the Diocese of Steubenville in Holy Name Cathedral in Steubenville, Ohio. During his years with the diocese, Foys served as diocesan treasurer, chairman of the diocesan Presbyteral Council, and moderator of the curia. 

Foys was appointed vicar general in 1982 and was named by the Vatican as a monsignor in 1987. He also taught canon law for one year at St. John Vianney Seminary. Pope John Paul II made Foys a prelate of honor in 1986 and a protonotary apostolic in 2001.

Bishop of Covington 
On May 31, 2002, John Paul II appointed Foys as bishop of the Diocese of Covington.  Foys was consecrated by Bishop Thomas C. Kelly at the Cathedral Basilica of the Assumption in Covington on July 15, 2002.

Sex abuse scandal 
Foys came to the Diocese of Covington in the midst of a class action lawsuit concerning the sexual abuse of minors by over 80 diocesan employees, including priests. The lawsuit was filed one day before Foys was appointed bishop. The claim was originally for $50 million, but grew during the years of litigation. Foys vowed to meet with every victim of abuse who was willing to meet saying,"Those harmed by these shameful, despicable deeds now need the institutional Church and, more importantly, the pastoral Church to provide as much comfort and peace as possible. Our hearts must remain open, like Christ's". Foys eventually met with over 70 victims of abuse personally and agree to create a system of payment where victims who were abused between 1948 and 1998 could receive compensation while not having to undergo the process of a trial.The settlement eventually cost the diocese $120 million. Each victim received between $5,000 and $450,000, depending on the severity of their case. Foys remarked:"While no amount of money can compensate for the atrocities that were committed here, I pray that this settlement will bring victims some measure of peace and healing to victims and their loved ones".

Vocations 
The number of priestly vocations in the diocese dramatically increased under Foys' tenure. It was speculated that Foys experience as a vocation director in the Diocese of Steubenville was a factor, along with more diocesan resources to vocation promotion. As of 2013, the diocese had 28 seminarians studying for the priesthood.

Pater Noster controversy 
In anticipation of the release of the third edition of the Roman Missal and General Instruction of the Roman Missal, Foys issued a decree that discouraged the laity from holding hands during the Pater Noster (or "Our Father") at the celebration of mass. The decree states, "Special note should also be made concerning the gesture for the Our Father. Only the priest is given the instruction to "extend" his hands. Neither the deacon nor the lay faithful are instructed to do this. No gesture is prescribed for the lay faithful in the Roman Missal; nor the General Instruction of the Roman Missal, therefore the extending or holding of hands by the faithful should not be performed."  The decree caused controversy in the diocese.

Lincoln Memorial incident 
After an incident at the Lincoln Memorial in Washington D.C. in January 2019 between students from Covington Catholic High School and Native American activist Nathan Philips, the diocese and the high school initially released a joint statement condemning the actions of the Covington students. However, after further details emerged, Foys retracted the statement.  He apologized to the students, claiming that the diocese was "bullied and pressured into making a statement prematurely." Foys stated that "I especially apologize to Nicholas Sandmann and his family, as well as to all CovCath families who have felt abandoned during this ordeal."

Retirement
Pope Francis accepted Foys' resignation as bishop of Covington on July 13, 2021.

Coat of arms

References

External links
Roman Catholic Diocese of Covington Home Page

1945 births
Franciscan University of Steubenville alumni
Roman Catholic bishops of Covington
Catholic University of America alumni
People from Steubenville, Ohio
Roman Catholic Diocese of Steubenville
Living people
Catholics from Ohio